Douvilleiceras is a genus of ammonites from the Middle to Late Cretaceous. Its fossils have been found worldwide, in Africa, Asia, Europe, and North and South America.

Description

Species
Species within the genus Douvilleiceras include:

 D. clementium
 D. inaequinodum (Quenstedt, 1849)
 D. mamillare
 D. mammillatum (Schlotheim, 1813)
 D. meyendorffi
 D. monile (Sowerby, 1836)
 D. muralense Stoyanow 1949
 D. offarcinatum
 D. orbignyi Hyatt, 1903
 D. scabrosum
 D. solitae
 D. spiniferum (Whiteaves, 1876)

Distribution
Fossils of Douvilleiceras are found in the Cretaceous of Angola, Brazil, Canada, Colombia (Capotes Formation, Cundinamarca), the Dominican Republic, Egypt, France, Iran, Japan, Madagascar, Mexico, Peru, South Africa, Switzerland, the former USSR, the United Kingdom, Alaska and Texas. D. inaequinodum fossils have been found in Albian strata of France.

Gallery

References

Bibliography

Further reading
 A Pictorial Guide to Fossils by Gerard Ramon Case
 Tzankov, V., 1963: Sur la presence d'Albien moyenzone des Douvilleiceras inaequinodum dans la region de Sviatov. Review of the Bulgarian Geological Society, 23: 213-215

External links

 L’Albien de l’Aube 
 Davjol

Ammonitida genera
Ancyloceratina
Cretaceous ammonites
Ammonites of Africa
Ammonites of Asia
Ammonites of Europe
Early Cretaceous ammonites of North America
Cretaceous Canada
Fossils of British Columbia
Cretaceous Mexico
Fossils of Mexico
Cretaceous United States
Ammonites of South America
Cretaceous Brazil
Fossils of Brazil
Cretaceous Colombia
Fossils of Colombia
Cretaceous Peru
Fossils of Peru
Albian life
Fossil taxa described in 1894